A hanging garden is a sustainable landscape architecture, an artistic garden or a small urban farm, attached to or built on a wall. They are mainly found in areas where land is scarce or where the farmer is mobile or not permanent.

History

The most famous hanging gardens were the legendary Hanging Gardens of Babylon. They were considered in antiquity as one of the Seven Wonders of the World, and were located in present-day Iraq.

Modern
In contemporary use, hanging gardens are a green wall on a ground level facade, a balcony, a terrace, or part of a roof garden of a home, or skyrise greenery with a residential, commercial, or government office building.

Products
Prefabricated modular hanging wall garden systems have been developed and are on the market internationally.

See also

Urban agriculture
Container gardening
Sustainable planting

 
Landscape architecture
Sustainable gardening
Sustainable products
Sustainable architecture
Types of garden
Urban agriculture